The original 2 World Trade Center (also known as the South Tower, Tower 2, Building Two, or 2 WTC) was one of the Twin Towers in the original World Trade Center in New York City. The Tower was completed and opened in 1973 at a height of 415 meters (1,362 ft) to the roof, distinguishable from its twin, the North Tower (1 World Trade Center), by its outdoor observation deck and the absence of a television antenna. Both the South Tower and the North Tower had mechanical floors, and the same type of walls. On the 107th floor of this building was a popular tourist attraction called "Top of the World Trade Center Observatories," and on the roof was an observation deck accessible to the public and a disused helipad at the center. The address of this building was 2 World Trade Center with the WTC complex having its own ZIP code of 10048.

The South Tower was destroyed along with the North Tower in the September 11 attacks. At 9:03 a.m, seventeen minutes after its twin was hit, the South Tower was struck by United Airlines Flight 175. Although it was the second of the two skyscrapers to be hit by a hijacked airliner, it was the first to collapse, at 9:58:59 a.m. having stood for 55 minutes after the crash. Of the 2,977 victims killed in the attacks, around 850 were in the South Tower or on the ground.

The new 2 World Trade Center, which is currently on hold, is planned to have a diagonally-pointed roof, with no observation deck, and no mechanical floors. At the National September 11 Memorial & Museum, the southern pool marks the spot where the South Tower stood.

Tenants 
Note: Floor numbers in  red  are part of United Airlines Flight 175's impact area during the September 11 attacks, with floors above this zone marked in  dark gray .

NOTE: Atlantic Bank of New York had moved out in July 2001, but they were still paying for the rent as of September 2001.

Notes

References

External links
 Building: 2 World Trade Center - South Tower CNN

World Trade Center
Lists of companies based in New York (state)
Manhattan-related lists
Two